The 1953 Purdue Boilermakers football team was an American football team that represented Purdue University during the 1953 Big Ten Conference football season. In their seventh season under head coach Stu Holcomb, the Boilermakers compiled a 2–7 record, finished in eighth place in the Big Ten Conference with a 2–4 record against conference opponents, and were outscored by their opponents by a total of 167 to 89.

Notable players on the 1953 Purdue team included guard Tom Bettis.

Schedule

References

Purdue
Purdue Boilermakers football seasons
Purdue Boilermakers football